The  Gorakhpur - Anand Vihar Express is an express train of the Indian Railways connecting Gorakhpur in Uttar Pradesh and Anand Vihar Terminal in Delhi via Basti. It is currently being operated with 15057/15058 train numbers on a weekly basis.

Service 
It averages 53 km/hr as 150575 Gorakhpur - Anand Vihar Express starts on Thursday and covering 749 km in 14 hrs 15 mins & 49 km/hr as 12596 Anand Vihar - Gorakhpur - Express starts on Friday covering 7490 km in 15 hrs 10 mins.

Route and halts

Coach composite

The train consists of 21 coaches :
 1 AC II Tier
 4 AC III Tier
 7 Sleeper Coaches
 8 General
 2 Second-class Luggage/parcel van

Rake Maintenance 

The train is maintained by the Anand Vihar Coaching Depot. The same rake is used for Mau - Anand Vihar Terminal Express for one way which is altered by the second rake on the other way.

Traction

Both trains are hauled by a Ghaziabad Loco Shed based WAP-5 or WAP-4 electric locomotives. Occasionally, it has also been hauled by a WAP-7 locomotive.

Notes

References

External links
15057/Gorakhpur - Anand Vihar Express (Weekly)
15058/Anand Vihar - Gorakhpur Weekly Express

Passenger trains originating from Gorakhpur
Transport in Delhi
Railway services introduced in 2015
Express trains in India
Rail transport in Delhi
2015 establishments in India